The Concho County Courthouse on Public Sq. in Paint Rock, Texas is a courthouse built in 1886.  It was listed on the National Register of Historic Places in 1977.

It was designed in Second Empire style by architect F.E. Ruffini and was built under supervision of Oscar Ruffini.

It is a Texas State Antiquities Landmark and a Recorded Texas Historic Landmark.

References

Courthouses in Texas
Courthouses on the National Register of Historic Places in Texas
National Register of Historic Places in Concho County, Texas
Second Empire architecture in Texas
Government buildings completed in 1886